Svartå is a locality situated in Degerfors Municipality, Örebro County, Sweden with 495 inhabitants in 2010.

References 

Populated places in Örebro County
Populated places in Degerfors Municipality